The Greenlandic National Badminton Championships is a tournament organized to crown the best badminton players in Greenland. They have been held since 1980.

Past winners

References
Badminton Europe - Details of affiliated national organisations

Badminton in Greenland
National badminton championships
Sports competitions in Greenland
Recurring sporting events established in 1980